John Whittaker may refer to:
John Whittaker (UKIP politician) (born 1945), British MEP
John Edmondson Whittaker (1897–1945), British Member of Parliament 
John Macnaghten Whittaker (1905–1984), British mathematician and university administrator
John Whittaker (businessman) (born 1942), British billionaire
John Whittaker (rugby league) (1950–2020), New Zealand rugby league player
John William Whittaker (–1854), Anglican clergyman
John C. Whittaker (born 1953), American archaeologist
John S. Whittaker (1817–c. 1897), Justice of the Louisiana Supreme Court

See also
John Whitaker (disambiguation)
Jack Whittaker (disambiguation)